Malmslätt is a locality situated in Linköping Municipality, Östergötland County, Sweden with 5,214 inhabitants in 2010.

Malmen Airbase and the Swedish Air Force Museum is located in the town.

References

External links

Populated places in Östergötland County
Populated places in Linköping Municipality